The 137th New York State Legislature, consisting of the New York State Senate and the New York State Assembly, met from January 7 to May 20, 1914, while Martin H. Glynn was Governor of New York, in Albany.

Background
Under the provisions of the New York Constitution of 1894, re-apportioned in 1906 and 1907, 51 Senators and 150 assemblymen were elected in single-seat districts; senators for a two-year term, assemblymen for a one-year term. The senatorial districts were made up of entire counties, except New York County (twelve districts), Kings County (eight districts), Erie County (three districts) and Monroe County (two districts). The Assembly districts were made up of contiguous area, all within the same county.

At this time there were two major political parties: the Republican Party and the Democratic Party. The Progressive Party, the Socialist Party, the Independence League and the Prohibition Party also nominated tickets.

Elections
The New York state election, 1913, was held on November 4. The only two statewide elective offices up for election were two judgeships on the New York Court of Appeals. Democrat Willard Bartlett was elected Chief Judge, and Republican Frank H. Hiscock was elected an associate judge, which had been cross-endorsed by the Independence League. The approximate party strength at this election, as expressed by the vote for Chief Judge, was: Democrats-Independence League 600,000; Republicans 597,000; Progressives 195,000; Socialists 62,000; and Prohibition 17,000.

Ex-Governor William Sulzer who had been impeached, and removed from office in September 1913, was elected on the Progressive ticket to the Assembly.

Sessions
The Legislature met for the regular session at the State Capitol in Albany on January 7, 1914; and adjourned on March 28.

Thaddeus C. Sweet (R) was elected Speaker with 81 votes against 48 for Al Smith (D) and 21 for Michael Schaap (P).

John F. Murtaugh (D) was elected Majority Leader of the New York State Senate while Robert F. Wagner (D) continued as president pro tempore of the State Senate and Acting Lieutenant Governor.

On February 25, the Legislature elected Homer D. Call (P) as New York State Treasurer, to fill the vacancy caused by the suicide of John J. Kennedy (D). Call was elected by a combination of Democrats and Progressives with 98 votes against 96 for Republican William Archer.

The Legislature met for a special session at the State Capitol in Albany on May 4, 1914; and adjourned on May 20. This session was called because the Democratic Senate majority and the Republican Assembly majority were at odds over the State's budget, and did not approve the necessary financial appropriations during the regular session.

State Senate

Districts

Members
The asterisk (*) denotes members of the previous Legislature who continued in office as members of this Legislature.

Note: For brevity, the chairmanships omit the words "...the Committee on (the)..."

Employees
 Clerk: Patrick E. McCabe
 Sergeant-at-Arms: Henry W. Doll
 Stenographer: William F. MacReynolds

State Assembly
Note: For brevity, the chairmanships omit the words "...the Committee on (the)..."

Assemblymen

Employees
 Clerk: Fred W. Hammond
 Sergeant-at-Arms: Harry W. Haines
 Principal Doorkeeper: Fred R. Smith
 First Assistant Doorkeeper: James B. Hulse
 Second Assistant Doorkeeper: Michael Kehoe
 Stenographer: Henry C. Lammert
Postmaster: James H. Underwood

Notes

Sources
 MEMBERS OF THE NEW YORK STATE SENATE (for the next two sessions), in The Cornell Daily Sun (Volume XXXIII, Number 76) on December 21, 1912
 VOTERS' GUIDE FOR THE NEW ASSEMBLY in The New York Times on October 26, 1913 
 GREATER NEW YORK AND LONG ISLAND VOTE in the Brooklyn Daily Eagle on November 5, 1913
 REPUBLICANS' MARGIN IN NEXT ASSEMBLY 20 in the New York Tribune on November 6, 1913
 CAUCUS CHOOSES SWEET FOR SPEAKER in The New York Times on January 7, 1914
 COMMITTEE PLUMS GO TO BARNES MEN in The New York Times on January 20, 1914
 POLICE BILL KILLED BY ASSEMBLY VOTE in The New York Times on March 25, 1914
 FEW GOOD WORDS FOR ASSEMBLYMEN in The New York Times on August 13, 1914

137
1914 in New York (state)
1914 U.S. legislative sessions